Robert Parry may refer to:

Bob Parry (born 1953), Australian cricket umpire
Robert Parry (journalist) (1949–2018), American journalist
Robert Parry (poet) (1540–1612), Elizabethan Welsh poet
Robert Parry (politician) (1933–2000), British politician
Robert Parry (priest), Dean of Lismore from 1647 to 1660
Robert W. Parry (1917–2006), American chemist
R. Williams Parry (1884–1956), 20th-century Welsh poet

See also
Robert Perry
Robin Parry, Christian theologian